Melica arzivencoi is a grass species in the family Poaceae that is endemic to Brazil where it can be found in Rio Grande do Sul. It was described by Valls and Barcellos in 1973.

Description
The species is bisexual, cespitose, perennial and is rhizomatous. They are also erect, decumbent, and scabrous at the same time. Leaf-sheaths are closed and are both glabrous and scabrous. They are also flat, linear and have an adaxial bottom which is hispid and tipped. Panicles are erect, narrow and dense. When young, they are bright violet in colour, and carry 1-2 bisexual florets by maturity. The glumes are acute, glabrous, hyaline, membranous, and lanceolated at the same time and have 3-5 veines.

Ecology
Flowers bloom from December to February.

References

arzivencoi
Plants described in 1973
Endemic flora of Brazil